In Kampf ("In Struggle") was a Yiddish-language weekly newspaper published from Warsaw, Poland. In Kampf was an organ of the Labour Zionist Poalei Zion Right.

References

Defunct newspapers published in Poland
Labor Zionism
Newspapers published in Warsaw
Yiddish-language mass media in Poland
Yiddish socialist newspapers
Weekly newspapers published in Poland
Zionism in Poland